Smithtown is a town in Suffolk County, New York on the North Shore of Long Island. It is part of the New York metropolitan area. The population was 116,296 at the 2020 Census.

The census-designated place (CDP) of Smithtown lies within the town's borders.

History

Smithtown, originally known as "Smithfield", was first settled circa 1665. Local legend has it that, after rescuing a Native American chief's abducted daughter, Richard Smith was told that the chief would grant title to all of the land Smith could encircle in one day "on a bull". Smith chose to ride the bull on the longest day of the year (summer solstice), to enable him to ride longer "in one day". The land he acquired in this way is said to approximate the current town's location. There is a large, anatomically correct, statue of Smith's bull, known as Whisper, at the fork of Jericho Turnpike (New York State Route 25) and St. Johnland Road (New York State Route 25A).

The border between Smithtown and the town of Huntington is partially defined by Bread and Cheese Hollow Road (Suffolk County Road 4), so named after Bread and Cheese hollow, which according to legend is where Smith stopped on his ride to have a lunch of bread and cheese. The road is reputed to follow part of his original ride. The border between Smithtown and Huntington was also the site of Fort Salonga, a British fort that was the site of a battle of the American Revolution during 1781.

The Smithtown hamlet of Nesconset was the home of Spaceplex, an indoor amusement park and arcade that was falsely accused of being the abduction site in the Katie Beers kidnapping case in 1992.

Geography
The Town of Smithtown is located at 40° 52' 13" North, 73° 13' 3" West (40.862786, −73.215175).

According to the United States Census Bureau, the town has a total area of 111.4 square miles (288.5 km2), of which 53.6 square miles (138.8 km2)  is land and 57.8 square miles (149.7 km2)  (51.89%) is water.

Demographics

As of the census of 2000, there were 115,715 people, 38,487 households, and 31,482 families residing in the town. The population density was 2,159.9 people per square mile (833.9/km2). There were 39,357 housing units at an average density of 734.6 per square mile (283.6/km2). The racial makeup of the town was:

 114,817 or 99.2% mono-racial
 110,546 or 95.5% White
 748 or 0.65% Black or African American,
 78 or 0.01% Native American
 1,763 or 1.7% Asian
 22 or less than 0.01% Pacific Islander
 660 or 0.6% from other races
 898 or 0.8% from two or more races.
 3,855 or 3.3% Hispanic or Latino

There were 38,487 households, out of which 38.5% had children under the age of 18 living with them, 71.6% were married couples living together, 7.5% had a female householder with no husband present, and 18.2% were non-families. 15.2% of all households were made up of individuals, and 7.2% had someone living alone who was 65 years of age or older. The average household size was 2.95 and the average family size was 3.28.

In the town, the population was spread out, with 26.0% under the age of 18, 5.4% from 18 to 24, 30.4% from 25 to 44, 24.8% from 45 to 64, and 13.4% who were 65 years of age or older. The median age was 38 years. For every 100 females, there were 94.6 males. For every 1000 females age 18 and over, there were 911.2 males.

According to a 2007 estimate, the median income for a household in the town was $100,165, and the median income for a family was $110,776.

Males had a median income of $61,348 versus $38,208 for females. The per capita income for the town was $31,401. About 2.1% of families and 3.0% of the population were below the poverty line, including 2.9% of those under age 18 and 4.7% of those age 65 or over.

Ancestries: Italian (35.3%), Irish (26.0%), German (18.7%), Polish (6.9%), English (5.0%), Russian (4.1%).

Government and politics

The present town hall and seat of the town was built in 1912 on Main Street in Smithtown.

In 2015 the town hall was dedicated and renamed after former Supervisor Patrick R. Vecchio.

Smithtown is led by a Town Supervisor and a four-member Town Council, elected town-wide with each serving four year terms. Elections are held in odd-numbered years, with two of the councilmembers being up for re-election each year.

The current Supervisor is Edward Wehrheim who has been Town Supervisor since 2018. His predecessor, Patrick Vecchio was in office for forty years, the longest elected town supervisor in the history of the United States. Elected as a Democrat during a special election, Vecchio switched parties in 1993 in an attempt to run for County Executive. Although defeated in the primary by Robert Gaffney, Vecchio remained a Republican until his death in 2019. He is the longest serving town supervisor in all of New York State. Vecchio ran in 2013 against former Councilman Robert Creighton, of the Conservative Party. Supervisor Vecchio won the Republican Primary against Councilman Creighton and then later defeated the Councilman in the General Election 45-30%. The Democratic candidate, Steven Snair received 25% of the vote. Councilman Creighton was later ousted in 2015 by Lisa Inzerillo. In the 2017 Republican primary, then-Councilman Ed Wehrheim received about forty votes more than Vecchio. The race was too close to call and a recount was demanded by Vecchio. Following the recount a week later, Wehrheim was declared the winner, nearly doubling his lead. Vecchio conceded the race the same day saying "“All good things come to an end." On November 7, 2017, Ed Wehrheim defeated William Holst in the election for the town's next supervisor. Wehrheim succeeded Vecchio on January 1, 2018. On January 10, 2018, Thomas Lohmann was appointed to the seat vacated by Wehrheim's election.

The Town of Smithtown has always been dominated by Republicans at all levels of government. This one-party domination has often led to infighting between factions of the Republican Party in Smithtown with the most recent between Supervisor Vecchio and Smithtown Republican Party Chairman William Ellis. In recent times the Republican party has dominated the Town Board; the last Democratic Town Supervisor being Mr. Vecchio. The most Republican areas for Smithtown are its three incorporated villages, Nissequogue, Head of the Harbor, and the Branch, along with the hamlets of Smithtown and Kings Park. The weakest areas for the Republican party in Smithtown is the edges of the Town in the hamlets of Commack and Hauppauge. In 2016, President Donald Trump defeated Hillary Clinton by 28 points, the highest performing town for him on all of Long Island. Democratic County Executive Steve Bellone has won the town, in two of his three runs for that office. 

In addition to presidential politics, the Town of Smithtown is also the power bases of many State and County elected officials. The former New York State Senate Majority Leader John J. Flanagan had the bulk of his district located in Smithtown. Current Republican Comptroller John M. Kennedy, Jr., along with his wife, Suffolk County Legislator Leslie Kennedy both reside in Nesconset.

Former Supervisor Vecchio died on April 6, 2019 at the age of 88.

Communities and locations

Villages (incorporated) 
 Head of the Harbor
 Nissequogue
 Village of the Branch
Village of the Landing (former; dissolved 1939)

Hamlets (unincorporated)
 Commack (in part, with the Town of Huntington)
 Fort Salonga (in part, with the Town of Huntington)
 Hauppauge (in part, with the Town of Islip)
 Kings Park
 Lake Ronkonkoma (in part with the Town of Brookhaven and Town of Islip)
 Nesconset
 Smithtown
 St. James

Other communities
 North Smithtown
 San Remo
Smithtown Pines

State parks
 Caleb Smith State Park Preserve, a state park southwest of Smithtown village
 Sunken Meadow State Park
 Nissequogue River State Park
 Blydenburgh Park Historic District

Notable people

 Mose Allison, American jazz and blues pianist, singer and song writer
  Marcus Barone (Mark Barone), Film Music Executive, Supervisor, Composer 
 Cooper Andrews, actor
 Craig Biggio, former Major League baseball player
 Frank Catalanotto, former Major League baseball player
 Adam Conover, American comedian, actor, and writer
 Dan Corbett, weather broadcaster for the BBC
 Bob Costas, American sportscaster
 John Curtis, American baseball player
 Amanda Daflos, American political figure
 John Daly, Olympic athlete
 David DiVona, musician and television personality
 Michael J. Epstein, filmmaker, musician, artist, and writer
 Nick Fanti, Major League baseball player
 Mick Foley, former pro wrestler and author
 Ilana Glazer, actress and comedian (Broad City)
 Andrew Gross, noted author
 John Hampson, Nine Days lead vocalist
 Emily Hart, American actress (younger sister of Melissa Joan Hart)
 Melissa Joan Hart,  American actress (elder sister of Emily Hart)
 Jodi Hauptman, Senior Curator at The Museum of Modern Art, New York; organizer of landmark exhibitions Henri Matisse: The Cut-Outs and Georges Seurat - The Drawings
 Andrew Hauptman, businessman and owner of the Chicago Fire Soccer Club
 Eddie Hayes, celebrated attorney, bon vivant, and memoirist
 Chris Higgins, National Hockey League player
 Keith Law, sportswriter and blogger
 Fredric Lebow, screenwriter
 Curtis Lepore, Internet personality
 Andrew Levy, publicist and co-host of Fox News' Red Eye
 Lori Loughlin, actress
 Lynn Martin, 68th president of the New York Stock Exchange
 Jim Mecir, Major League baseball player
 John Miceli, drummer for Meat Loaf
 Michael P. Murphy, Medal of Honor recipient, KIA in operation Red Wing
 Soledad O'Brien, Chairwoman of Starfish Media Group; former CNN News anchor
 Kyle Palmieri, National Hockey League player
 John Petrucci, Dream Theater guitarist
 Jodi Picoult, novelist
 Stephen Rannazzisi, American actor
 Jai Rodriguez, Queer Eye and Broadway actor
 Scott Snyder, comic book writer and author
 Kevin Thoms, American actor
 Jeremy Wall, founding pianist of the jazz fusion band Spyro Gyra
 William Weld, 68th Governor of Massachusetts (1991–1997)
 William H. Wickham, 81st Mayor of New York City
 Matt Yallof, SNY sports broadcaster

Media
Smithtown broadcasts its board meetings on SGTV, the Town of Smithtown's public service television station; Optimum channel 18 or Verizon Fios channel 27. The Times of Smithtown newspaper carries community-based articles.

Emergency services
Fire Protection and Emergency Medical Services are provided by the seven Volunteer Fire Departments, and two Volunteer Ambulance Corps that cover parts of the Township. The Smithtown, Kings Park, Saint James, Nesconset, and Nissequogue Fire Departments provide both Fire Protection, as well as Emergency Medical Services to their districts. The Commack Fire Department and Commack Volunteer Ambulance Corps provide coverage for the Commack hamlet, which is divided between the Town of Smithtown, and the Town of Huntington. The Hauppauge Volunteer Fire Department and Central Islip-Hauppauge Volunteer Ambulance Corps provide coverage to the Hauppauge hamlet, which is divided between the Town of Smithtown, and the Town of Islip.

Smithtown is policed by the 4th Precinct of the Suffolk County Police Department. The Suffolk County Police are the primary law enforcement agency in Smithtown. They are responsible for responding to all 911 emergency calls. The Smithtown Department of Public Safety is an agency with limited powers. The Park Ranger Division is made up peace officers as defined in the Criminal Procedural Law of the state of New York. Their enforcement powers are limited to Smithtown town property. The Department of Public Safety also has a Harbor Master division and Fire Marshall division.

Emergency medical care can be found at St. Catherine of Siena Medical Center, located in Smithtown, as well as the nearby Stony Brook University Hospital, located in Stony Brook, in the neighboring Town of Brookhaven.

Transportation

Railroad lines
The Town of Smithtown is also home to the Kings Park, Smithtown, and Saint James stations of the Long Island Rail Road's Port Jefferson Branch.

Bus service
The Town of Smithtown is served entirely by Suffolk County Transit bus routes.

Major roads

 Interstate 495 is the Long Island Expressway, and the sole interstate highway in the Town of Smithtown although only in the southwest corner of the town between Exit 52 in Commack and east of Exit 53 in Brentwood.
 Northern State Parkway was the sole west-east limited-access highway in the Town of Smithtown until the construction of the Long Island Expressway. It has interchanges from Exit 43 in Commack on the Huntington-Smithtown Town Line to Veterans Memorial Highway in Hauppauge. Extensions further east were proposed at one time.
 Sagtikos State Parkway is the south-north parkway that enters the Town of Smithtown from Brentwood at the interchange with the Long Island Expressway, and terminates at the Northern State Parkway (Exit SM1) in Commack, where it becomes the Sunken Meadow State Parkway.
 Sunken Meadow State Parkway is the dominant south-north parkway within the western Town of Smithtown. It begins at Northern State Parkway as a continuation of Sagtikos State Parkway in Commack, winding northeast, until it reaches Sunken Meadow State Park immediately after the interchange with NY 25A.
 New York State Route 25A, the northernmost west-east state highway on Long Island including the Town of Smithtown. It enters the town from Bread and Cheese Hollow Road in Fort Salonga, winding through the hills of Fort Salonga through Kings Park where it becomes Main Street, then makes a sharp turn to the south onto Saint Johnland Road before passing the Smithtown Bull where it overlaps NY 25 and becomes Main Street. In the Village of the Branch, NY 25A leaves the overlap across from NY 111 where it runs along North Country Road as it heads northeast through Saint James and Head of the Harbor before crossing the Smithtown-Brookhaven Town Line west of Stony Brook.
 New York State Route 25 runs west to east along Jericho Turnpike from Suffolk CR 4 at the Huntington-Smithtown Town Line through Main Street at the Smithtown Bull where it overlaps with NY 25A until separating with that route again at NY 111 in the Village of the Branch. East of there it runs along Main Street, then Middle Country Road through the Smithtown-Brookhaven Town Line in the Village of Lake Grove.
 County Route 16, includes Terry Road from the eastern border of the Village of the Branch to northeastern Hauppauge, and Smithtown Boulevard from northeastern Hauppauge through Nesconset to the northern shores of Lake Ronkonkoma.
 County Route 67; the remaining drivable portion of the Long Island Motor Parkway
 New York State Route 111
 New York State Route 347
 New York State Route 454

Education

Smithtown Central School District is home of seven elementary schools, three middle schools, and two high schools.

The Town of Smithtown is also home to the Kings Park Central School District, a portion of the Commack Union-Free School District (shared with the Town of Huntington), a portion of the Hauppauge School District (shared with the Town of Islip) and a portion of the Sachem Central School District (shared with the Town of Brookhaven).

Elementary schools
 Accompsett Elementary School
 Branch Brook Elementary School (Closed)
 Dogwood Elementary School
 Mills Pond Elementary School
 Mt. Pleasant Elementary School
 Nesconset Elementary School (Closed)
 Smithtown Elementary School
 St. James Elementary School
 Tackan Elementary School

Middle schools
 Accompsett Middle School (formerly Smithtown High School Freshman Campus 1992-2005)
 Great Hollow Middle School
 Nessaquake Middle school

Smithtown High School
 Eastern Campus (formerly Smithtown Central High School, 1960s-1973; formerly Smithtown High School East, 1973–1992; formerly Smithtown Middle School, 1992–2005) - located in St. James
 The High School's Eastern Campus is composed of graduates of Nesaquake Middle School and those graduates of Great Hollow Middle School that reside in the Tackan and Nesconset Elementary area.

 Western Campus (formerly Smithtown High School West, 1973–1992; formerly Smithtown High School 10-12 Building, 1992–2005)- located in south of the Kings Park Hamlet and west of the Smithtown Bull
 The High School's Western Campus is composed of graduates of Accompsett Middle School and those graduates of Great Hollow Middle School that reside in the Mt. Pleasant and Branch Brook Elementary area.

Private schools
 Smithtown Christian School (pre-school to twelfth grade)

Former schools (No longer used as K-12 Facilities)
 New York Avenue Junior High School- (now the Joseph M. Barton/New York Avenue Building) Currently the central office and headquarters of Smithown Central School District
 Smithtown Branch High School- Smithtown High School before the opening of Smithtown Central High School in the 1960s

See also
National Register of Historic Places listings in Smithtown (town), New York

References

External links

 Smithtown Central School District Website
 Town of Smithtown, NY
 Smithtown history
 Bullrider Smith's Bull "Whisper" Courtesy Maggiblanck.com
 Kings Park Heritage Museum
 Kings Park Chamber of Commerce
 Smithtown Government Television

 
Towns on Long Island
Towns in Suffolk County, New York
Towns in the New York metropolitan area
Populated coastal places in New York (state)